William Lynn (20 January 1947 – July 2014) was an English professional footballer who played as a winger for Huddersfield Town and Rotherham United. He was born in Newcastle upon Tyne.

References

1947 births
2014 deaths
English footballers
Footballers from Newcastle upon Tyne
Association football wingers
Huddersfield Town A.F.C. players
Rotherham United F.C. players
English Football League players